Inayatullah Khan is a Pakistani politician hailing from Upper Dir District and belongs to Jamaat-e-Islami Pakistan. He had been a member of the Provincial Assembly of Khyber Pakhtunkhwa from August 2018 till January 2023.

Inayatullah khan cleared the competitive exam of Pakistan (CSS) in the year 2002 but he didn't join civil services because he contested election in 2002 and was elected as MPA and later Health Minister of Khyber Pakhtunkhwa, the erstwhile NWFP. Inayatullah Khan played a vital role in his tenure developing the health facilities in the province. He inaugurated various hospitals in Swat, Mardan, Peshawar and other places of the province.

He was also Minister of Local Government, Elections & Rural Development in the Khyber Pakhtunkhwa Assembly. He was also serving as committee chairman of Special Committee on the issue of Business activities in the University Town Peshawar, Select Committee on Local Government, member of the committee The Khyber Pakhtunkhwa Police Bill, 2017 and Committee on The Khyber Pakhtunkhwa Whistleblower Protection and Vigilance commission Bill.

External links

References

Living people
Pashtun people
Khyber Pakhtunkhwa MPAs 2013–2018
People from Upper Dir District
Jamaat-e-Islami Pakistan politicians
Muttahida Majlis-e-Amal MPAs (Khyber Pakhtunkhwa)
Year of birth missing (living people)